Liberty Hill School or Liberty Hill Schoolhouse may refer to:

Liberty Hill Schoolhouse (Gainesville, Florida), listed on the National Register of Historic Places (NRHP)
Liberty Hill School (Ellerbe, North Carolina), listed on the NRHP in Richmond County, North Carolina
Liberty Hill School (Liberty Hill, Tennessee), NRHP-listed in Williamson County

See also
Liberty Hill (disambiguation)
Liberty School (disambiguation)